ITX may refer to:
 Isopropyl thioxanthone
 Information Technology eXtended computer form factors: Mini-ITX, Nano-ITX, Pico-ITX, Mobile-ITX
 ITX-Cheongchun, ITX-Saemaeul, Intercity Train Express, South Korea